Al-Mazunah Free Zone ( Arabic  : المنطقة الحرة بالمزيونة) is a free zone established in 1999 in Oman as a trade zone, Dhofar region in Walayat  Al-Mazyounah.  It is located in the south western of Oman in the border to Yemen.  By the  Royal Decree 103/2005 it was given all the characteristics of a Free Zone  and its management assigned to the Public Establishment for Industrial Estates - Madayn, the main government arm responsible for developing and managing prime industrial lands in Oman. Many Exemptions and facilities are offered for businesses operating in the free zone. Almazunah Free Zone occupies area around 4.5 million square meters. In 2010 a long-term investment agreement has been entered between the Public Establishment for Industrial Estates and Golden Hala Company to develop and operate an area of 3 million square meters.

References

See also 
https://web.archive.org/web/20120420204330/http://www.peie.om/tabid/100/Default.aspx
http://www.mfz.om

http://www.albawaba.com/business/oman-free-trade-zone-442651
http://omanlawblog.curtis.com/2010/08/in-news-al-mazunah-free-zone.html

http://main.omanobserver.om/node/74106
http://www.locations4business.com/middle-east/oman/dhofar/al-mazunah-free-zone/latest-developments/

Economy of Oman
Special economic zones